Frelseren Church is a parish church of the Church of Norway in Farsund Municipality in Agder county, Norway. It is located in the town of Farsund. It is one of the three churches for the Farsund parish which is part of the Lister og Mandal prosti (deanery) in the Diocese of Agder og Telemark. The white, stone church was built in a rectangular design in 1905 using plans drawn up in 1785 (for the previous church) by the architect George Johnstone from Scotland. The church seats about 380 people.

History
The stone church was founded in 1785 to serve the growing town of Farsund. The church is a rectangular church with the nave and choir in the same room. In 1901, the church burned down and only the exterior stone walls remained. In 1905, the church was rebuilt using what remained of the old exterior walls, but with a completely new interior. The only items from the interior that were saved from the fire was the baptismal font and a chandelier that had hung over the aisle.

Media gallery

See also
List of churches in Agder og Telemark

References

Farsund
Churches in Agder
Stone churches in Norway
20th-century Church of Norway church buildings
Churches completed in 1905
1785 establishments in Norway